Derrick Clark (born March 3, 1971) is an American college basketball coach, currently an assistant coach at Loyola Marymount University. He was previously head coach at Metro State University in Denver, Colorado.

Clark played for coach Mike Dunlap at California Lutheran University.  After a short professional career in Australia, he joined Dunlap's coaching staff at Metro State and was on the bench for the Roadrunners' two Division II national championships in 1999 and 2002.  In 2005, Clark left Metro State to join Jeff Bzdelik's staff at Division I Air Force, later following Bzdelik to Colorado.

In 2010, Clark was named head coach at Metro State, following Brannon Hays.  Clark had immediate success at Metro State, leading the Roadrunners to back to back NCAA tournament appearances.  In 2013, he led the team to the Division II national championship game, where the Roadrunners fell to Drury University 74–73.  The next season, MSU went 32–2, undefeated in the Rocky Mountain Athletic Conference, and again went to the Division II Final Four.  There they were upset by eventual champion Central Missouri.

Head coaching record

References

External links
Metro State biography

1971 births
Living people
Air Force Falcons men's basketball coaches
American expatriate basketball people in Australia
American men's basketball players
Basketball coaches from Indiana
Basketball players from Indiana
Cal Lutheran Kingsmen basketball players
College men's basketball head coaches in the United States
Colorado Buffaloes men's basketball coaches
Loyola Marymount Lions men's basketball coaches
Metro State Roadrunners men's basketball coaches
Sportspeople from Muncie, Indiana